Doctor Who is a British science fiction television programme produced by the BBC. The show has been a large influence in the media since its inception. 1966 saw the first radio broadcast of the show.

There have been many Doctor Who radio broadcasts over the years. In addition to a small number of in-house BBC productions, a larger number of radio plays produced by Big Finish began to be broadcast on BBC Radio 7 from 2005, featuring the Eighth Doctor (again played by Paul McGann) with mainstay companions Charley Pollard and later Lucie Miller. Initially, these were broadcasts of Big Finish productions that had already been released on CD. However, the series that began with Blood of the Daleks and concluded with Human Resources was specially commissioned by the BBC from Big Finish for broadcast prior to the CD release. Many more of these were released on CD than were broadcast on the radio; only those plays broadcast by the BBC are listed here. See the list of Doctor Who audio releases as a starting point for other audio plays and audio books, notably the List of Doctor Who audio plays by Big Finish which includes more plays than were broadcast.

List of radio stories

Eighth Doctor dramas 

The following are all Eighth Doctor dramas produced by Big Finish and broadcast on BBC Radio 7.

Fifth Doctor dramas 

In 2011, BBC Radio 4 Extra aired a series of three Fifth Doctor dramas produced by Big Finish. They continued with five more from September 2015.

Fourth Doctor dramas 

December 2011 saw the broadcast of the Fourth Doctor audio Hornets' Nest on BBC Radio 4 Extra. In May 2015, the first series of Fourth Doctor adventures from Big Finish Productions was broadcast featuring Tom Baker and Louise Jameson. The sequels to Hornets' Nest, Demon Quest and Serpent Crest followed in December 2016 and February 2017 respectively.

Seventh Doctor dramas 

In 2012, BBC Radio 4 Extra began a series of Seventh Doctor dramas produced by Big Finish.

Sixth Doctor dramas 

In 2016, BBC Radio 4 Extra began a series of Sixth Doctor dramas produced by Big Finish.

Audiobook readings

BBC Radio 4 Extra has aired some of BBC Audio's audiobook readings of Classic Series novelisations, all read by Tom Baker.

50th Anniversary stories

In 2013, BBC Radio 4 Extra broadcast 8 audio adventures and talking books from both Big Finish and Audio Go under the title of "Doctor Who at 50".

Webcasts

Death Comes to Time was released on CD by the BBC, and later re-released as an MP3 CD featuring the original illustrations. Real Time and Shada were released on CD by Big Finish. The webcast for Shada was released on DVD on 7 January 2013 as part of 'The Legacy Collection' and is only viewable on a PC or MAC. Scream of the Shalka was released in novel form in the Past Doctor Adventures series. While it has been classified for DVD release by the BBFC, a planned release was postponed due to the programme's return to television. It was later released on 16 September 2013.

See also

 Doctor Who
 List of Doctor Who serials
 List of Doctor Who missing episodes
 List of unmade Doctor Who serials
 List of Doctor Who audio releases
 List of special Doctor Who episodes

References

External links
 Doctor Who Reference Guide – detailed descriptions of all televised episodes, plus spin-off audio, video, and literary works.

Doctor Who serials
Doctor Who series
Radio Stories
Doctor Who